The 2010–11 Tulsa Oilers season was the 19th season of the CHL franchise in Tulsa, Oklahoma.

Regular season

Conference standings

Awards and records

Awards

Milestones

Transactions
The Oilers have been involved in the following transactions during the 2010–11 season.

Roster

Affiliates
NHL - Colorado Avalanche
AHL - Lake Erie Monsters

See also
 2010–11 CHL season

References

External links
 2010–11 Tulsa Oilers season at Pointstreak

T
T